Margaret Jenkins (July 2, 1903 – January 8, 1996) was an American athlete. She competed in the women's discus throw at the 1928 Summer Olympics and the 1932 Summer Olympics.

References

1903 births
1996 deaths
Athletes (track and field) at the 1928 Summer Olympics
Athletes (track and field) at the 1932 Summer Olympics
American female discus throwers
Olympic track and field athletes of the United States
Place of birth missing
20th-century American women